Ameerjan was an Indian film director, who has directed Tamil films. He was primarily active in the 1984-1991 and is most noted for his work on films featuring actors Murali and Karthik.

Career
Ameerjan began his career as a protégé to director K. Balachander and then won critical acclaim for his directorial debut in 1984 with Poovilangu, which starred actors Murali and Kuyili in the lead roles. He went on to direct more than 20 feature films, both in Tamil and Telugu, often collaborating with actors Murali and Karthik. Ameerjan also worked on a high-budget action film Siva (1989) featuring Rajinikanth as well as on socially relevant films such as Thulasi (1987). As opportunities declined, he began assisting K. Balachander when he started making television shows and also directed his own shows. In 2006, he also held the position of secretary in the Directors' Association of Tamil film makers.

He suffered a cardiac arrest and died on 17 March 2015 in Saligramam, leaving behind his wife  Son and a daughter.

Filmography

References

External links

Tamil film directors
Film directors from Tamil Nadu
1942 births
2015 deaths
People from Salem, Tamil Nadu
20th-century Indian film directors